The 2010 Lamar Hunt U.S. Open Cup was the 97th edition of the USSF's annual national soccer championship, running from June through early October.

The tournament proper featured teams from the top five levels of the American Soccer Pyramid. These five levels, namely Major League Soccer, the USSF D-2 Pro League, the United Soccer Leagues (Second Division and Premier Development League), and the United States Adult Soccer Association, each have their own separate qualification process to trim their ranks down to their final eight team delegations in the months leading up to the start of the tournament proper. The eight MLS clubs received byes into the third round, while the remaining 32 teams played in the first two rounds, with brackets influenced by geography.

The final took place on October 5, with Seattle Sounders FC defeating the Columbus Crew 2–1 at Qwest Field in Seattle, WA, in front of a U.S. Open Cup record crowd of 31,311. The Sounders became the first MLS team (and first team in 27 years) to win back-to-back Open Cups.

Matchdays

Participating teams

The tournament consisted of 40 teams. Eight teams each from the MLS, PDL, and USASA qualified according to their own procedures. All 15 American D-2 Pro league and USL Second Division teams qualified. The final slot went to the winner of a one-game playoff between the Sonoma County Sol and PSA Los Gatos Storm.

Major League Soccer (8 teams)

Chicago Fire
Chivas USA
Columbus Crew
Houston Dynamo

Los Angeles Galaxy
Seattle Sounders FC
New York Red Bulls
D.C. United

USSF D-2 Pro League (9 teams)

Austin Aztex FC
Carolina RailHawks FC
Crystal Palace Baltimore
Miami FC
NSC Minnesota Stars

Portland Timbers
Rochester Rhinos
AC St. Louis
FC Tampa Bay

USL Second Division (6 teams)

Charleston Battery
Charlotte Eagles
Harrisburg City Islanders

Pittsburgh Riverhounds
Real Maryland Monarchs
Richmond Kickers

Premier Development League (8 teams)

Kitsap Pumas
Reading United
Ventura County Fusion
Long Island Rough Riders

Dayton Dutch Lions
Des Moines Menace
DFW Tornados
Central Florida Kraze

United States Adult Soccer Association (9 teams)

Brooklyn Italians
New York Pancyprian-Freedoms
KC Athletics
Detroit United
CASL Elite

Legends FC
Arizona Sahuaros (NPSL)
Bay Area Ambassadors (NPSL)
Sonoma County Sol (NPSL)

Open Cup bracket
Match pairings were determined by a blind draw. The Second round winners advanced to play one of eight MLS clubs in 16-team knockout tournament.
Home teams listed on top of bracket

Schedule
Note: Scorelines use the standard U.S. convention of placing the home team on the right-hand side of box scores.

First round

Second round

Third round

Quarterfinals

Semifinals

Final

Goal scorers

5 goals
 Paulo Araujo Jr. (MIA)
 Nate Jaqua (SEA)
4 goals
 Bright Dike (POR)
3 goals
 Perica Marošević (AUS)
2 goals
 Mike Ambersley (STL)
 Geoff Bloes (HAR)
 Justin Braun (CHV)
 Phil Da Silva (BAY)
 Matthew Delicâte (RIC)
 John Fishbaugher (KIT)
 Andy Iro (CLB)
 Thabiso Khumalo (DC)
 Steven Lenhart (CLB)
 Sanna Nyassi (SEA)
 Dominic Oppong (HAR)
 Jesús Padilla (CHV)
 Tyler Rosenlund (ROC)
 Warren Ukah (MIN)
 Jamie Watson (AUS)
1 goal
 Kwame Adjeman-Pamboe (TB)
 Guillermo Barros Schelotto (CLB)
 Simone Bracalello (MIN)
 Branko Bošković (DC)
 Sallieu Bundu (CAR)

1 goal (continued)
 Kevin Burns (CLB)
 Chad Burt (TB)
 Robby Christner (KIT)
 Levi Coleman (CHS)
 Kevin Cornwall (AZ)
 Nick DeLeon (AZ)
 Yendry Diaz (TB)
 Bobby Foglesong (RIC)
 Jamie Franks (ROC)
 Eddie Gaven (CLB)
 Adam Gazda (PIT)
 Christian Gómez (MIA)
 Alex Grendi (LI)
 Marco Hamilton (BRK)
 Tommy Heinemann (CHS)
 Pablo Hernández (DC)
 Neil Hlavaty (MIN)
 Stephen Hoffman (KC)
 Taylor Hyde (KIT)
 Nate Jafta (HAR)
 Ousman Jagne (VEN)
 Juninho (LA)
 Aaron King (TB)
 Chris Klein (LA)
 Danny Kramer (LI)
 Michael Lahoud (CHV)
 James Marcelin (POR)
 Brandon Massie (CHS)
 Pierre-Rudolph Mayard (CHS)
 Tim Merritt (CAS)

1 goal (continued)
 Josiah Millar (CF)
 Fredy Montero (SEA)
 Jaime Moreno (DC)
 Alex Nimo (POR)
 Paul Nittoli (BRK)
 J.T. Noone (HAR)
 Jyler Noviello (RMM)
 Tino Nuñez (ROC)
 Dominic Oduro (HOU)
 Lovel Palmer (HOU)
 Nicki Paterson (RMM)
 Kyle Perkins (KC)
 Stephen Phillips (KIT)
 Aaron Pitchkolan (ROC)
 Zach Prince (CHS)
 Santino Quaranta (DC)
 Emilio Rentería (CLB)
 Alan Sanchez (RMM)
 Eric Schoenle (REA)
 Greg Shields (CAR)
 Ross Smith (POR)
 Darren Spicer (ROC)
 Takayuki Suzuki (POR)
 Dustin Swinehart (CAS)
 Abe Thompson (MIA)
 Alex Weekes (PIT)
 Yomby William (RIC)
 Joey Worthen (AUS)

External links
 TheCup.us 2010 match reports and results

References

 
2010
2010 in American soccer
2011–12 CONCACAF Champions League